Zakarpattia Oblast is subdivided into districts (raions) which are subdivided into territorial communities (hromadas).

Current

On 18 July 2020, the number of districts was reduced to six. These are:
 Berehove (Берегівський район), the center is in the town of Berehove;
 Khust (Хустський район), the center is in the town of Khust;
 Mukachevo (Мукачівський район), the center is in the town of Mukachevo; 
 Rakhiv (Рахівський район), the center is in the town of Rakhiv;
 Tiachiv (Тячівський район), the center is in the town of Tiachiv;
 Uzhhorod (Ужгородський район), the center is in the city of Uzhhorod.

Administrative divisions until 2020

Until June 2020, Zakarpattia Oblast was subdivided into 18 regions: 13 districts (raions) and 5 city municipalities (mis'krada or misto), officially known as territories governed by city councils.

Cities under the oblast's jurisdiction:
Uzhhorod (Ужгород), the administrative center of the oblast
Berehove Municipality 
Cities and towns under the city's jurisdiction:
Berehove (Берегове)
Chop (Чоп)
Khust Municipality 
Cities and towns under the city's jurisdiction:
Khust (Хуст)
Mukachevo (Мукачеве)
Districts (raions):
Berehove (Берегівський район)
Urban-type settlements under the district's jurisdiction:
Batiovo (Батьово)
Irshava (Іршавський район)
Cities and towns under the district's jurisdiction:
Irshava (Іршава)
Khust (Хустський район)
Urban-type settlements under the district's jurisdiction:
Vyshkovo (Вишково)
Mizhhiria (Міжгірський район)
Urban-type settlements under the district's jurisdiction:
Mizhhiria (Міжгір'я)
Mukachevo (Мукачівський район)
Urban-type settlements under the district's jurisdiction:
Chynadiieve (Чинадійово)
Kolchyno (Кольчино)
Perechyn (Перечинський район)
Cities and towns under the district's jurisdiction:
Perechyn (Перечин)
Rakhiv (Рахівський район)
Cities and towns under the district's jurisdiction:
Rakhiv (Рахів)
Urban-type settlements under the district's jurisdiction:
Kobyletska Poliana (Кобилецька Поляна)
Velykyi Bychkiv (Великий Бичків)
Yasinia (Ясіня)
Svaliava (Свалявський район)
Cities and towns under the district's jurisdiction:
Svaliava (Свалява)
Tiachiv (Тячівський район)
Cities and towns under the district's jurisdiction:
Tiachiv (Тячів)
Urban-type settlements under the district's jurisdiction:
Bushtyno (Буштино)
Dubove (Дубове)
Solotvyno (Солотвино)
Teresva (Тересва)
Ust-Chorna (Усть-Чорна)
Uzhhorod (Ужгородський район)
Urban-type settlements under the district's jurisdiction:
Serednie (Середнє)
Velykyi Bereznyi (Великоберезнянський район)
Urban-type settlements under the district's jurisdiction:
Velykyi Bereznyi (Великий Березний)
Vynohradiv (Виноградівський район)
Cities and towns under the district's jurisdiction:
Vynohradiv (Виноградів)
Urban-type settlements under the district's jurisdiction:
Korolevo (Королево)
Vylok (Вилок)
Volovets (Воловецький район)
Urban-type settlements under the district's jurisdiction:
Volovets (Воловець)
Zhdeniievo (Жденієво)

References

Zakarpattia
Zakarpattia Oblast